Financial infidelity is spending money, possessing credit or credit cards, holding secret accounts or stashes of money, borrowing money, or otherwise incurring debt, without the knowledge of one's spouse, partner, or significant other. It includes any decisions that affect the financial plan in the relationship. 

Financial infidelity may be on the rise, as a 2005 study showed that 30% of respondents had lied about financial information and 25% had withheld information, whereas a 2008 study showed that half the respondents had committed some form of financial infidelity.

References

Interpersonal conflict
Personal finance

External links 

 Your Cheatin' Wallet – story at The New York Times